Takydromus toyamai (ミヤコカナヘビ), also known commonly as the Miyako grass lizard, is a species of lizard in the family Lacertidae. The species is endemic to the Ryukyu Islands.

Etymology
The specific name, toyamai, is in honor of Japanese herpetologist Masanao Toyama.

Description
T. toyamai rarely exceeds  in total length, most of which is tail. It is usually green, while some juveniles can be brown.

Behavior and diet
T. toyamai is an active lizard, coming out during the day to forage for small insects.

Reproduction
T. toyami is oviparous.

Geographic range
T. toyamai is found in the Miyako Islands in the southern Ryukyu Islands.

Habitat
The preferred natural habitats of T. toyamai are grassland, shrubland, and forest.

Conservation status
T. toyamai is listed as endangered by the IUCN due to deforestation, and the introduction of peacocks and weasels.

In captivity
If kept as a pet, the Miyako grass lizard likes the temperature to be around  during the day, and  degrees at night. It prefers the humidity to be around 78%.

References

Further reading
Arnold EN (1997). "Interrelationships and evolution of the east Asian grass lizards, Takydromus (Squamata: Lacertidae)". Zoological Journal of the Linnean Society 119 (2): 267–296.
Schlüter U (2003). Die Langschwanzeidechsen der Gattung Takydromus. Karlsruhe, Germany: Kirschner & Seufer Verlag. 110 pp. . (Takydromus toyamai, p. 98). (in German).
Takeda, Nobuyuki; Ota, Hidetoshi (1996). "Description of a New Species of Takydromus from the Ryukyu Archipelago, Japan, and a Taxonomic Redefinition of T. smaragdinus Boulenger 1887 (Reptilia: Lacertidae)". Herpetologica 52 (1): 77–88. (Takydromus toyamai, new species).

Takydromus
Reptiles of Japan
Endemic fauna of the Ryukyu Islands
Reptiles described in 1996
Taxa named by Nobuyuki Takeda
Taxa named by Hidetoshi Ota